Jarčja Dolina is a dispersed settlement in a small valley west of Selo in the Municipality of Žiri in the Upper Carniola region of Slovenia. Rupe, in the eastern part of the settlement, was formerly an independent settlement known as Rupe pri Selu.

References

External links 
Jarčja Dolina on Geopedia

Populated places in the Municipality of Žiri